Parasiccia punctilinea is a moth of the subfamily Arctiinae. It was described by Wileman in 1911. It is found in Taiwan.

References

Lithosiini
Moths described in 1911